Jivan Avetisyan is an Armenian film director.

Biography
Jivan Avetisyan was born in Gyumri and grew up in Stepanakert, now he lives in Yerevan. 1993–1997 he attended the theater group of the Stepanakert children's creative center. In 1998 Jivan finished the N9 secondary school after Hovhannes Tumanyan in Stepanakert. 1998–1999 he was engaged in film directors courses at the Public Television of Armenia. 1999–2001 he served in the NKR Defense Army with mandatory military service. 2002–2007 he studied at the Yerevan State Institute of Theatre and Cinematography in the faculty of Feature Films. 1996–1997 he worked at the Stepanakert Dramatic Theater named after Vahram Papazyan. From 1998 to 1999 he worked as a lighting specialist at the Stepanakert Television. Later he was the director of the TV programs. 2003–2009 he worked as a director of films and TV programs at Yerkir Media TV company. From 2009 to 2014 he was the chief director at Yerkir Media. Since 2014 he has been the director of The Fish eye Art Cultural Foundation.

 Presentation-seminar of "Directors without Borders" film project at Golden Apricot International Film Festival (2006. 2007, 2013)
 Tbilisi War and Peace Reporting Institute, "War and the Press" practical training and contest (2009)
 In 2005 he took part in the "I am" international youth festival in Yerevan with the film "Towards the wind" and won a diploma
 Laureate of "The Best Programs of Cooperation" international Festival (Alma-Ata) organized by "Extremes" TV program, "Mir" TV Company
 With the film "Life Unobserved" he took part in the "Up and Coming" international film festival in Hannover, Germany (2006)
 Ischia International Film festival with the film "The Dawn is Peaceful in Artshakh"
 "Oriental Silver" Documentary Film Festival-Market in Jihlava, Czech Republic (2008)
 From 2007 to 2008 and 2013 with the films "Life Unobserved", "The Dawn is Peaceful in Artsakh" and "Broken Childhood" he took part in Golden Apricot International Film Festival, Yerevan;  for the film "Broken Childhood" was awarded a special prize named after Hrant Matevosyan
 With the films "Broken Childhood" and "Tevanik"  he took part in the 66th Cannes Film Festival, 2013
 During the Pan-Armenian contest "Best Scientific and Creative Work" of World Armenian Congress and Armenian Union of Russia he was awarded a prize as the Best Screenplay for the film "Life at the Borderline", 2013

Filmography

Feature films

Documentary films

Festivals/Awards
•	Chichester International Film Festival, Audience Award for Best Independent Film, film The Last Inhabitant 2019

•	"Dessaran Festival", Italy, Padua – Film screening, film "The Last Inhabitant" 2017

•	"Pomegranate Film Festival", Canada, Toronto – "Honorable Mention" in the "Best Feature Film" nomination, film "The Last Inhabitant" 2017

•	"Scandinavian International Film Festival", Finland, Helsinki – "Best Feature", "Best Actor"- Alexander Khachatryan, Prize for the film "The Last Inhabitant" 2017

•	"74th Venice International Film Festival", Italy, Venice – Screened in "Venice Production Bridge" film "The Last Inhabitant"  2016

•	"20th Shanghai International Film Festival", China, Shanghai – Screened in "Panorama Section", film "The Last Inhabitant"  2016

•	"Hollywood & Beyond's Film Festival", Los Angeles, USA – "Best International Feature Film", Prize for the film "Tevanik 2016

•	Cannes 69th International Film Market, France, Cannes - For distribution for the film "The Last Inhabitant" 2016

•	"Silver Akbuzat" International Film Festival, Ufa, Russia – " Best Director of Photography"  2015

•	"6th International Historical and Military Film Festival",  Warsaw, Poland - Special Prize, prize for the film "Tevanik" 2015

•	The Romania International Film Festival Romania -  Best Film , prize for the film "Tevanik" (2015)

•	The 2nd Annual World Entertainment Awards, Los Angeles, US, - Best Armenian Movie, prize for the film "Tevanik"(2015)

•	Screening at Sarajevo Film Festival-Cinelink Market International Film Festival, Bosnia and Herzegovina, the film "Tevanik". (2014)

•	Arpa International Film Festival,  Los Angeles, US,  Best Screenplay – prize for the film "Tevanik  (2014)

•	 First Silk Road International Film Festival,  Xian, China-  "People's Choice Award", prize for the film "Tevanik (2014)

•	Tbilisi International Film Festival,  Tbilisi,  Special screening at the closing ceremony. (2014)

•	Overlook International Film Festival,  Rome, Italy Jury award for Best Original Work.  (2014)

•	Nominated for  Asian Pacific Screen Awards,  Brisbane, Australia (2014)

•	Golden Apricot 11th International Film Festival "Best Armenian Fiction" prize for the film "Tevanik" (2014)

•	Cannes 67th International Film Market, Film "Tevanik" and the project of film "The Last Inhabitant" (2014)

•	"Baltik Event" Film Market, Films "Broken Childhood", "Tevanik" and the project of film "The last inhabitant" (2013)

•	Pomegranate Film Festival, Kanada, for the film "Broken Childhood", "Best short film" (2013)

•	Golden Apricot  10th International Film Festival "Hrant Mathevosian" special prize for the film "Broken Childhood" (2013)

•	Cannes 66th International Film Market, Film "Broken Childhood" and the project of film "Tevanik" (2013)

•	East Silver Documentary Film Market Jihlava , film "The Dawn is Peaseful in Artsakh" (2008)

•	"Golden Apricot" Yerevan 5th International Film Festival, film "The Dawn is Peaseful in Artsakh" (2008)

•	Ischia International Film Festival, film "The Dawn is Peaseful in Artsakh" (2007)

•	Golden Apricot Yerevan 4th International Film Festival, film  "Life Unobserved" (2007)

•	Up-and-Coming International Film Festival Hannover, film  "Life Unobserved" (2006)

•	Cooperation best programs film festival organized by TV company Mir Alma-Alta, laureate, film (2005)

•	It's me International Youth Film Festival, Yerevan, diploma, film "Towards the Wind" (2005)

References

External links 
 Jivan Avetisyan's IMDb
 President Armen Sarkissian hosted film director Jivan Avetissian
 Interview with Jivan Avetisyan, talented Armenian film director
 https://www.facebook.com/infoservicesofmothersee/posts/1247495005442468

1981 births
People from Gyumri
Armenian film directors
Living people